The Terrible Two is an American psychological/paranormal/horror film written and directed by Billy Lewis. The film stars Reid Doyle, Cari Moscow, Donny Boaz, Devin McGee, and Shane Callahan.

It was filmed during an eleven-day period in Wilmington, North Carolina using Lewis's home.

Plot 
One year after the deaths of their daughters Addie and Jade, Albert Poe is ready to move on from the loss while his wife Rose is still stuck in her grief, baking a birthday cake for the girls and speaking of them in present tense. Talking to her therapist Dr. Connor, Rose describes seeing evidence that her daughters are alive and mentions finding a manuscript about demons in the attic. He urges her and Albert to sell the house, as he senses something bad lurking there. Researching the house and its prior owner Jack Wilson, Rose discovers newspaper archives about suspicious activity in the house.

Albert lists the house for sale but dismisses the manuscript as religious propaganda until he discovers a tape recording showing that their daughters were coaxed onto the roof by an unseen entity, only to fall to their deaths. Albert and Rose are later chastised by a strange woman named Nebula, who appears in their home and states that if they had properly researched the house their daughters would still be alive. She cuts Albert's face with a knife before leaving, stating that nothing can save them. Later that night Albert wakes to find Rose in a trance-like state, brushing a doll's hair while saying that Albert never loved them nor made them a priority. A scene then shows that a local realtor named Fred is plotting with Nebula to force Albert and Rose out of the house, but that they must now allow events to play out on their own.

The next day Dr. Connor arrives at the house and informs Albert that Jack Wilson was a pseudonym for a man named Donovan Peebles. Twenty-five years prior to the deaths of Addie and Jade, Donovan murdered two Girl Scouts in the house in order to rid his body of demons. The two men then discover that Rose is in the girls' room and has been possessed. Albert manages to subdue Rose and seemingly free her from possession but is unsuccessful in convincing her to leave. He discovers a drawing of their deaths by the girls' hands and decides that they must leave. While going to get his gun, Albert discovers the dead body of Dr. Connor. While trying to flee the house Albert is confronted by his daughters, who demand that he tell the truth. It is revealed that Albert killed them by breaking their necks. Rose, now possessed, stabs Albert to death. The film ends with Fred showing the home to another family with two daughters, saying the house became too much for the previous owners.

Cast
 Cari Moscow as Rose Poe
 Reid Doyle as Albert Poe
 Arielle Breslerman as Addie Poe
 Ariana Baron as Jade Poe
 Devin McGee as Dr. Connor
 Martyn Woleben as Scott
 Tracy McMullan as Nebula
 Donny Boaz as Fred
 Eric Johann as Donovan Peebles

Release 
The Terrible Two was released through video-on-demand on March 6, 2018, by Uncork’d Entertainment.

Reception 
Horror Society rated the movie a 6.5 out of 10, stating that "It looks great, it’s shot well, the actors are phenomenal, the story is emotionally-charged and enthralling. The only thing that hinders it is the amount of horror. I’m sorry, I just wasn’t impressed. That needed to be turned up a notch…or two." Film Threat and Starburst both criticized the film, which Film Threat noted "struggles to find its footing, pulled apart by horror tropes, dodgy acting and unrealistic characters" and Starburst called "painful". Daily Grindhouse was also critical.

References

External links 
 
 

2018 films
2018 horror films
American psychological horror films
American supernatural horror films
2010s English-language films
2010s American films